The Special Air Service (SAS), along with men from the Special Boat Squadron (SBS), attempted to carry out a diversionary amphibious raid on Port Stanley Harbour on the night of 13–14 June 1982. The plan was, as 2 PARA attacked Wireless Ridge, 4 Rigid Raider fast landing crafts (steered by Sergeant Buckle, Lance-Corporal Gilbert and Marines Kavanagh and Nordic) and carrying some 30 SAS soldiers from D Squadron and six SBS reinforcements from 3 section would travel across the harbour and destroy the oil storage facilities on Cortley Ridge.

Incursion

The British commando force was spotted by a National Gendarmerie Special Forces officer aboard the Argentine hospital ship ARA Almirante Irízar (preparing to collect Major José Ricardo Spadaro's 601 National Gendarmerie Special Forces Squadron on Navy Point in order to insert them behind British lines on Beagle Ridge), before it could reach the fuel tanks. A massive barrage of fire from several weapons, including eight Hispano-Suiza HS.831 30mm anti-aircraft guns from 101 Anti-Aircraft Artillery Regiment's B Battery commanded by Major Jorge Alberto Monge was concentrated on the SAS/SBS raiders from positions along Cortley Ridge. Nevertheless, most of the raiders landed but heavy fire by sailors from Lieutenant Héctor Gazzolo's 3rd Naval Infantry Platoon prevented exploitation from the narrow beach, causing the SAS/SBS force to withdraw. The Argentine marines were supported by a section of sailors as infantry. According to John Parker's book SBS: The Inside Story of The Special Boat Service (Hachette, 2013), the four Rigid Raiders were sunk or damaged beyond repair and three British Special Forces were wounded in the attack:

 A six-man team from 3 SBS ... with D and G Squadrons, SAS, with the object of creating a diversionary assault from the sea ... were to move across the Murrell River by four fast power-boats ... The raiders had no option but to withdraw. One of the RRCs was badly damaged and limped back on hardly any power. The coxswain steered her by the hospital-ship for a shield and the boat died on them just as they reached the water's edge. Another sank just offshore, but close enough for the team to swim to safety ... An SBS corporal and two SAS troopers were wounded ... The RRCs were riddled with holes and had to be destroyed.

Aftermath

The wisdom of this attack was later questioned in British circles as it was seen by some as a reckless operation with little strategic benefit. However, the raid scrapped a major Argentine Special Forces operation and convinced the Argentine High Command into believing that a major landing was taking place that would bring the major buildings in Port Stanley within enemy small-arms fire. The Argentine Army Special Forces in Stanley, that were preparing with the Gendarmerie commandos for a major insertion behind British lines on Beagle Ridge, were instead sent aboard the armed transport ship ARA Forrest to help Major Jorge Monge on Cortley Ridge and Spadaro on nearby Navy Point to defend the anti-aircraft guns and round-up any SAS stragglers.

References

20th-century military history of the United Kingdom
1982 in the Falkland Islands
Amphibious operations involving the United Kingdom
Argentina–United Kingdom relations
Cortley Ridge
Cortley Ridge
June 1982 events in South America
Military raids
Special Air Service